Abdollahabad (also Romanized as ‘Abdollāhābād; also known as ‘Abdolābād) is a village in Vahdat Rural District, in the Central District of Zarand County, Kerman Province, Iran. At the 2006 census, its population was 336, in 85 families.

References 

Populated places in Zarand County